Petar Kasabov (born 22 January 1979) is a Bulgarian wrestler. He competed in the men's freestyle 69 kg at the 2000 Summer Olympics.

References

External links
 

1979 births
Living people
Bulgarian male sport wrestlers
Olympic wrestlers of Bulgaria
Wrestlers at the 2000 Summer Olympics
People from Petrich
Sportspeople from Blagoevgrad Province